Wilfred Roussel is a Canadian politician, who was elected to the Legislative Assembly of New Brunswick in the 2014 provincial election. He represented the electoral district of Shippagan-Lamèque-Miscou as a member of the Liberal Party from 2014 to 2018.

References

Living people
Members of the Executive Council of New Brunswick
New Brunswick Liberal Association MLAs
21st-century Canadian politicians
Year of birth missing (living people)